Roberto Bautista Agut was the defending champion, but chose to defend his title in s'Hertogenbosch instead.
Rafael Nadal won the title, defeating Viktor Troicki in the final, 7–6(7–3), 6–3.

Seeds
The top four seeds receive a bye into the second round.

Draw

Finals

Top half

Bottom half

Qualifying

Seeds

Qualifiers

Lucky losers
  Matthias Bachinger

Qualifying draw

First qualifier

Second qualifier

Third qualifier

Fourth qualifier

References

External links
 Main draw
 Qualifying draw

Singles 2015